Kajiado South Constituency, also known as Loitoktok Constituency is an electoral constituency in Kenya. It is one of five constituencies in Kajiado County. The constituency was established for the 1963 elections. The entire area of the constituency is located in Olkejuado county council.

Members of Parliament

Wards

References 

Constituencies in Kajiado County
Constituencies in Rift Valley Province
1963 establishments in Kenya
Constituencies established in 1963